Rucheng County is a county in Hunan Province, China, it is under the administration of the prefecture-level city of Chenzhou.

Located in the southeastern corner of the province, the county is bordered to the northwest by Yizhang County, to the north by Zixing City, to the northeast by Guidong County, to the east by Chongyi County, to the southeast by Renhua County, to the southwest by Lechang City. The county has nine towns and five townships under its jurisdiction, the county seat is Luyang Town.

Rucheng County is also the home of the Yao people, Yao ethnic minority accounts for 15.27% of the population; Another local minority is She people, it accounts for 0.24% of the population in the county.

Administrative divisions
9 towns
 Daping
 Jingpo
 Luyang
 Maqiao
 Nuanshui
 Quanshui
 Reshui
 Sanjiangkou
 Tuqiao

3 townships
 Haotou
 Jiyi
 Nandong

2 ethnic townships
 Yao Wenming
 Yao Yanshou

Climate

References

  www.xzqh.org

External links 

 
County-level divisions of Hunan
Geography of Chenzhou